Deh-e Qasem (also Romanized as Deh-e Qāsem) is a village in Baladarband Rural District, in the Central District of Kermanshah County, Kermanshah Province, Iran. At the 2006 census, its population was 104, in 26 families.

References 

Populated places in Kermanshah County